David 'Dandy' Nicholls (1956–2017) was a British jockey and racehorse trainer who competed in flat racing. He was particularly noted for his success training horses who raced over five and six furlongs and was nicknamed “the Sprint King”Sprint-King-David-Dandy-Nicholls.

Nicholls was born in Pudsey, West Yorkshire, in 1956, and spent his early racing career as an apprentice jockey in the stables of Deryck Bastiman at Wetherby, riding his first winner in 1973. He subsequently worked for Clifford Watts at Bridlington and then David Chapman. At Chapman's stables he formed a partnership with the filly Soba, on whom he won the Stewards' Cup in 1982. He was nicknamed "Dandy" after the actress Dandy Nichols.

Nicholls retired in 1993 after riding 421 winners and began a training career at stables at Sessay, sending out his first winner in December of the same year.  He gained his nickname of “the Sprint King” with victories in several of the sport's major Group 1 races and repeat victories in top handicap races including six wins in the Ayr Gold Cup, three in the Stewards' Cup and four in the Epsom Dash. His final winner was Sovereign Debt in 2017 and he retired from training shortly after citing financial problems. He trained the winners of 1,269 races.

Nicholls died in June 2017, aged 61.

Major wins as a trainer 
Great Britain
 Haydock Sprint Cup - (1) - Regal Parade (2009)
 July Cup - (1) - Continent (2002)
 Nunthorpe Stakes - (2) - Ya Malak (1997), Bahamian Pirate (2004)

France
 Prix de l'Abbaye de Longchamp - (1) - Continent (2002)
 Prix Maurice de Gheest - (1) - Regal Parade (2010)

References

1956 births
2017 deaths
English jockeys
British racehorse trainers
Sportspeople from Pudsey